Blandiana is a commune located in Alba County, Transylvania, Romania. It has a population of 1,187 and is composed of five villages: Acmariu (Akmár), Blandiana, Ibru, Poieni and Răcătău (Rakató).

Blandiana borders the following localities:  Meteș and Zlatna to the north, Vințu de Jos to the east, Săliștea and Șibot to the south, and Ceru-Băcăinți to the west.

Attractions
Wooden church (1768, renovated in the 19th century) in Acmariu village.
Piatra Tomii Nature Reserve.
The Romanian Orthodox Church of the Holy Archangels, replacing a wooden church built in 1890. The new church is different from others because of the wooden bell tower. The relatively low nave with a semicircular wooden ceiling extends over the apse.

Cultural references
Poet Ana Blandiana took her name after the commune, which is located near Vințu de Jos, her mother's home village.

References

Communes in Alba County
Localities in Transylvania